Bukola Dammy Abogunloko (born 18 August 1994) is a Nigerian sprinter. She was part of the Nigerian 4 × 400 metres relay team at the 2012 Olympics that made it to the final. However, they were disqualified in the finals.

References

External links

1994 births
Nigerian female sprinters
Athletes (track and field) at the 2012 Summer Olympics
Olympic athletes of Nigeria
Athletes (track and field) at the 2010 Summer Youth Olympics
Commonwealth Games competitors for Nigeria
Athletes (track and field) at the 2010 Commonwealth Games
Living people
Olympic female sprinters
21st-century Nigerian women